The  Mehran River  is a river in Hormozgan Province in the south of Iran. It rises in the south of Fars Province, and flows through the towns of Jenah and Kookherd in Hormozgan Province. It terminates in a delta in the area of the Hara forests on the Khuran Strait, part of the Persian Gulf.

See also
Kookherd
Bastak
Kukherd District
Bandar Lengeh
Hormozgān

References
1.	الكوخردى ، محمد ، بن يوسف، (كُوخِرد حَاضِرَة اِسلامِيةَ عَلي ضِفافِ نَهر مِهران) الطبعة الثالثة ،دبى: سنة 199۷ للميلاد Mohammed Kookherdi (1997) Kookherd, an Islamic civil at Mehran river,  third edition: Dubai
2. کامله،القاسمی،  بنت شیخ عبدالله، (تاریخ لنجة)  مکتبة دبي للتوزیع، الامارات: الطبعة الثانية عام ۱۹۹۳ للمیلاد
3. الوحیدی الخنجی، حسین بن علی بن احمد،  «تاریخ لنجه» ، الطبعة الثانية دبی: دار الأمة للنشر والتوزیع، ۱۹۸۸ للمیلاد
4. محمدیان، کوخری، محمد ، “ (به یاد کوخرد) “، ج1. ج2. چاپ اول، دبی: سال انتشار 2003 میلادی Mohammed Kookherdi Mohammadyan (2003), Beyade Kookherd, third edition : Dubai.
5. اطلس گیتاشناسی استان‌های ایران [Atlas Gitashenasi Ostanhai Iran] (Gitashenasi Province Atlas of Iran)

Bastak County
Rivers of Iran
Landforms of Hormozgan Province